Sébastien Deleigne (born 4 July 1967) is a French modern pentathlete. He competed in four Olympic Games between 1992 and 2004.

References

1967 births
Living people
French male modern pentathletes
Olympic modern pentathletes of France
Modern pentathletes at the 1992 Summer Olympics
Modern pentathletes at the 1996 Summer Olympics
Modern pentathletes at the 2000 Summer Olympics
Modern pentathletes at the 2004 Summer Olympics
Sportspeople from Toulouse
20th-century French people